Ralph E. Davis Jr. (September 7, 1938 – May 30, 2021) was an American professional basketball player who played two seasons in the National Basketball Association (NBA) and was a starter on two NCAA Final Four teams at the University of Cincinnati.

Early life
Davis was born in Vanceburg, Kentucky, the son of Ralph E. Davis Sr., a self-employed businessman, and  Anna Louis (Plummer) Davis. He played basketball at Lewis County High School in Vanceburg. He scored 1,810 points for the Lions and averaged 26.4 points and 18 rebounds per game as a senior. He was an all-district selection for three years. As a senior in 1956 he was named second team all-state by Louisville Courier-Journal as he led the Lions to the Eastern Kentucky Conference title. He was also an honor student.

College career
Davis attended the University of Cincinnati, where he was a three-year starter for the Bearcats and coach George Smith.

As a sophomore in 1957–58, he averaged 7.9 points per game as the Bearcats posted a 25–1 record and won the Missouri Valley Conference (MVC) title led by fellow sophomore and future Hall-of-Famer forward Oscar Robertson and future longtime NBA player Connie Dierking.

As a junior in 1958–59, Davis started at point guard alongside Carl Bouldin and averaged 15.5 points (second to Robertson), 4.4 assists and 2.0 rebounds as the Bearcats were again MVC champions and Davis was named All-MVC. The 26–4 Bearcats advanced to the NCAA Final Four, where they finished in third place.

As a senior in 1959–60, Davis posted averages of 13.7 points (again second to Robertson), 4.4 assists and 2.0 rebounds per game while shooting 50 percent from the field as again the Bearcats won the league crown. Davis was named All-MVC and was also named second-team All-American by Converse. The Bearcats went 28–2, again advancing to the Final Four and again finishing third.

Davis' 1,093 career points ranked sixth in Cincinnati history upon his graduation in 1960.

NBA career
Davis was drafted in the third round (17th overall) of the 1960 NBA draft by the Cincinnati Royals.

As a rookie in 1960–61, he played in 73 games, averaged 16.6 minutes, 2.4 assists and 1.2 rebounds per game as a reserve guard for the 33–46 Royals.

On April 26, 1961 he was drafted by the Chicago Packers in the NBA expansion draft. For the 1961–62 season, in 77 games Davis' playing time increased to nearly 26 minutes per game as he posted career-high averages of 10.4 points, 3.2 assists and 2.1 rebounds per game for the 18–62 expansion team. In November 1961, the Packers had traded Davis to the St. Louis Hawks in a multi-player deal, but the trade was rescinded by NBA Commissioner Maurice Podoloff.

In 1962 he was officially traded to the St. Louis Hawks, but he did not play and his NBA career ended after two seasons.

Personal life
In 1981, Davis was inducted into the University of Cincinnati Athletics Hall of Fame. In 1998, he was inducted into the Greater Cincinnati Basketball Hall of Fame. In December 2010, Lewis County High School held a ceremony to retire Davis' number.

Davis was inducted into the inaugural class of the Lewis County high schools Hall of Fame in 2021.   

Davis died on May 30, 2021, at age 82.

References

1938 births
2021 deaths
American men's basketball players
Basketball players from Kentucky
Chicago Packers expansion draft picks
Chicago Packers players
Cincinnati Bearcats men's basketball players
Cincinnati Royals draft picks
Cincinnati Royals players
People from Reading, Ohio
People from Vanceburg, Kentucky
Shooting guards